Bitso began as a global cryptocurrency exchange founded in Mexico. It was founded in 2014 by Ben Peters, Pablo Gonzalez and Daniel Vogel. Daniel Vogel is the current chief executive officer. Bitso was the first Latin American company and one of the few crypto-currency platforms to be regulated by the Gibraltar Financial Services Commission under its Distributed Ledger Technology Framework.

History 

Founded January 23, 2014, by Ben Peters and Pablo Gonzalez, Bitso was Mexico's first Bitcoin exchange, also operating a Ripple gateway, allowing international flows of pesos, US dollars, and Bitcoin with the objective of facilitating US-to-Mexico remittances. At the time, the exchange supported 50 percent of the trading volume for the Mexican Peso/Bitcoin trading pair, its chief competitor at the time being LocalBitcoins, which handled a similar volume.

In 2015, Daniel Vogel, who would go on to become CEO, joined the team as an equal partner, and Bitso acquired a smaller Mexican cryptocurrency exchange Unisend. Bitso's trading volume at the time was itself still quite small, at 33.4 BTC per day, or around US$7,300. After the acquisition, Unisend's CEO Jose Rodriguez took on the role of vice president for payments.

In 2016, Bitso began selling bitcoins over-the-counter in Mexican convenience stores, through a partnership with Zmart Group, offering bitcoins in over 29,000 locations. The same year, the company closed a $2.5 million round of investment with various investors including Digital Currency Group, Monex, Variv Capital, Xochi Ventures. At the time, Bitso had 20,000 customers and processed about $2.5m worth of transactions a week. One of its main stated goals was to provide services to un-banked people in Mexico, which represents close to half of the population.

In 2018, the platform was announced as one of Ripple's first “preferred digital asset exchanges”, along with Bittrex and Coins.ph. Thomson Reuters began using Bitso to source its quotes for various cryptocurrencies.

In 2019, the exchange had 750,000 users in Mexico. In October, Ripple invested in the company, in a bid to expand its operations in Latin America. Two months earlier, Bitso had become the first Distributed Ledger Technology (DLT) licensed exchange in Latin America.

In 2020, the company announced that it had surpassed one million customers, of which 92 percent were Mexicans, after its trade volume surged more than 300 percent over a period of eight months. Also, in February that year, Bitso officially launched operations in Argentina.

In May 2021, the company launched operations in Brazil and shortly afterwards announced a Series C investment round led by Tiger Global and Coatue which raised US$250 million, valuing the company at US$2.2 billion.

In September 2021, the company started operations in El Salvador.

References

External links 

 Official website

Bitcoin exchanges
Digital currency exchanges